Harry Juhani "Hjallis" Harkimo (born 2 November 1953) is a Finnish businessman, sportsperson, and a member of the Finnish Parliament. Previously a National Coalition Party MP, he now chairs his own political party, Movement Now.

First elected to the Parliament in 2015 representing NCP, his tenure in the party was cut short following his complaints about leadership in 2018. He then proceeded to establish and register his new political movement simply as an association due to strong disdain toward traditional party politics. Following his successful re-election campaign in 2019, Harkimo decided to register Movement Now as a party afterall, explaining that "the whole system was built so that thriving in it won't be possible without having a party."

In the Parliament, Harkimo sits in opposition, although he voted in favor of swearing in the Rinne Cabinet. He later explained this by saying he wanted to give the government platform a chance, since he considered many of its goals positive. Since then, Harkimo and Movement Now have been more critical of the government, even by joining in on some joint opposition interpellations.

Sailing
In the 1981–82 season Harkimo was a crewmember on the yacht Skopbank of Finland in the Whitbread Round the World Yacht Race.

From 1986 to 1987 he participated in a round-the-world single-handed yacht race, BOC Challenge, and finished third.

In the 1989–90 season he was a crewmember on the yacht Belmont Finland in the Whitbread Round the World Yacht Race.

Political career
 
In 1988 Finnish presidential election, Harkimo was Harri Holkeri's constituent.

Harkimo was elected to the Eduskunta in 2015 with 11,416 votes in the election. Although he was elected representing the National Coalition Party, in 2018 he left the party and founded a new political movement, Movement Now. In the 2019 parliamentary election, Harkimo was elected to the parliament as the sole representative from Movement Now.

Harkimo told in late August 2020 that he is running for Mayor of Helsinki in 2021 Finnish municipal elections

Presidential election 2024
In 2022, Harkimo was nominated as the Movement Now candidate for the Finnish presidential election of 2024.

Business
Harkimo was the chairman of the board of the Helsinki-based ice-hockey team Jokerit 1991-2019. 

Hjallis had been dreaming of his own ice rink since 1994. At that time, the club was playing in the Helsinki Ice Hall together with HIFK, and Harkimo had understood that there would be no continuity in the operations of the Jokerit, if it continued in the same hall. He as a builder and developer of the team's home arena, Hartwall Areena, and had been an investor in sports.

Harkimo shared a common interest with HJK. Hjallis bought the PK-35 and renamed the club FC Jokerit with the aim of attracting Jokerit hockey fans to the football audience as well. Harkimo had experience in stadium construction after leading the Hartwall Arena project, which was completed in 1997. Harkimo raised FIM 64 million in private funding, the City of Helsinki paid 32 million from the budget and the state 14 million, and so the new football stadium began to rise rapidly along Urheilukatu. Töölö football stadium was completed on 10 June 2000, just in time for the opening match between FC Jokerit and HJK. Eventually, HJK acquired the FC Jokerit football operations and formed the reserve team HJK Klubi 04 when, in March 2004, Hjallis Harkimo announced the closure of FC Jokerit.

Harkimo was a talk show hosted by "With Hjallis" on MTV3. In the program, Harkimo interviewed economic and political figures as well as other public figures.

The first production period of the program was presented from 27 January to 31 March 2011, the second from 8 March to 10 May 2012 and the third from 7 March to 9 May 2013. The fourth season, which was presented from 2 November to 21 December 2013 and the name was changed to "Hjallis". Unlike in the fourth season, there are three guests instead of one. The fifth season of the series was shown from 26 September to 19 December 2014. The sixth production season began on 11 March 2016. In the sixth season, there are two guests in each episode.

In the 2012 presidential election, Harkimo supported the Coalition Party's Sauli Niinistö campaign with 10,000 euros through Hjallis Promotion Oy.

Harkimo hosted the Finnish version of The Apprentice from 2009 until 2013. and made a one-season return in 2018.

In October 2017, Harkimo started to publish YouTube videos, discussing politics, business, sports and other subjects.

In 2019 Harkimo bought the 49% share of Jokerit from Russians Gennady Timchenko and Roman Rotenberg, the owners of Arena Events Oy. Harkimo then sold 100% of Jokerit to Jari Kurri, a long time manager of the club. Harkimo's intent was to exclude the club from the US sanction list drawn upon the annexation of Crimea.

Personal life
Harkimo married his first wife, MP Leena Harkimo in 1989. The pair filed for divorce in 2002. He later married MP Merikukka Forsius-Harkimo in 2004, but they divorced after only a year of marriage. Harkimo has two sons from his first marriage and a third from his second marriage.

Harkimo has been a vegetarian since the beginning of 2018.

References

External links
 
 

1953 births
Living people
Politicians from Helsinki
Businesspeople from Helsinki
Swedish-speaking Finns
National Coalition Party politicians
Movement Now politicians
Leaders of political parties in Finland
Members of the Parliament of Finland (2015–19)
Members of the Parliament of Finland (2019–23)
Single-handed circumnavigating sailors
Finnish round-the-world sailors
Finnish sports executives and administrators
Finnish ice hockey people
Volvo Ocean Race sailors